The Red River Formation is a stratigraphical unit of Late Ordovician age in the Williston Basin. 

It takes the name from the Red River of the North, and was first described in outcrop in the Tyndall Stone quarries and along the Red River Valley by A.F. Foerste in 1929.

Lithology

Subdivisions

The Red River Formation is composed of the following subdivisions from top to base:

Fort Garry Member: crystalline and micritic dolomite with an argillaceous dolomite breccia in the middle
Selkirk Member: fossiliferous, dolomitic limestone
Cat Head Member: cherty dolomite, becoming calcareous to the south
Dog Head Member: fossiliferous dolomitic limestone

Distribution

Relationship to other units

The Red River Formation is slightly unconformably overlain by the Stony Mountain Formation and sharply overlays the Winnipeg Formation in Manitoba, the Deadwood Formation in western Saskatchewan and the Canadian Shield in northern Manitoba.

The lower Red River Formation is equivalent to the Yeoman Formation, while the Fort Garry Member correlates with the Herald Formation.

References

Stratigraphy of Manitoba
Ordovician southern paleotropical deposits